Kepke is a Latvian surname. Notable people with the surname include:

 Augusts Kepke (1886–?), Russian cyclist
 Kārlis Kepke (1890–?), Russian cyclist

Latvian-language surnames